Mouna Raagam 2 is a 2021-2023 Indian television drama which premiered on Star Vijay and stream on Disney+ Hotstar. It was produced by Avanthika Creations, starring Salmanul Faris, Raveena Daha, Rahul Ramachandran and Shilpa in lead role. It is a Sequel of Mouna Raagam. It was premiered on 1 February 2021 and ended on 17 March 2023 with 517 Episodes.

Cast

Main
 Raveena Daha as Shakthi (Sathya) – Karthik and Mallika's daughter and Varun's wife
 Shilpa as Shruthi - Raghav and Kadhambari's daughter; Tharun's wife
 Salmanul Faris as Varun Manoharan - Manohar and Kasthuri's elder son; Shakthi's husband
 Rahul Ramachandran as Tharun Manoharan – Manoharan and Kasthuri's younger son; Varun's brother; Shruthi's husband.
 Rajeev Parameshwar as Karthik Krishna – Playback singer; Parvati's younger son; Murali's brother; Mallika and Kaadhambari's husband; Shakthi's father and Shruthi's step father.
 Chippy Ranjith as Mallika- Natural singer, Palani's sister. Karthik's first wife and Shakthi's mother
 Anusree Chembakaserry as Kaadhambari- Vishwanathan and Rukmani's elder daughter. Karthik's second wife and Shruthi's mother

Recurring 

 A. Revathy as Parvathi Krishna – Murali's and Karthik's mother; Shakthi and Shruti's grandmother.
 Uday Mahesh / Krishna Kumar Menon as Manoharan – Karthik's best friend; Sheela's brother; Kasthuri's husband; Varun and Tharun's father.
 Divya Binu as Sheela – Manoharan's sister; Varun and Tharun's aunt; Kasthuri's sister-in-law.
 Manjula / Remya Sudha as Kasthuri Manoharan – Manoharan's wife; Varun and Tharun's mother.
 Anjali Devi as Rukmani Vishwanathan – Vishwanathan's wife; Kadhambari and Maya's mother; Shruthi's grandmother.
 Kailas Nath as Sugumar - Shakthi's uncle.
 Supergood Kannan as Pazhaniswamy aka Pazhani – Mallika's brother; Swarna's husband; Nila's father; Shakthi's uncle. 
 Seema G. Nair as Swarna Pazhaniswamy – Pazhani's wife; Nila's mother; Shakthi's aunt.
 Anand Babu as Vishwanathan – Rukmani's husband; Kaadhambari and Maya's father; Shruthi's grandfather
 Reshma Nandhu as Shalini

Production

Release
The first promo was unveiled on 11 January 2021, featuring the cast, the second promo was unveiled on 28 January 2021, by revealing the release date.

References

External links 
 Mouna Raagam 2 at Hotstar
 

Star Vijay original programming
Tamil-language musical television series
Tamil-language romance television series
2021 Tamil-language television series debuts
2021 Tamil-language television seasons
Tamil-language sequel television series
Tamil-language television soap operas
2023 Tamil-language television series endings